The first season of La Más Draga premiered on 8 May and concluded on 19 June 2018. The competition was broadcast on YouTube, and was produced by La Gran Diabla Producciones. The series featured seven contestants, from all over Mexico City, competing for the title of La Más Draga of Mexico and Latin America and a cash prize of $50,000 MXN Pesos. The winner of the first season of La Más Draga was Deborah La Grande, with Bárbara Durango, Eva Blunt and Margaret Y Ya as runners-up.

The judges panel of this season include Mexican singer and actress Lorena Herrera, who was also the main host, TV and Internet personality Johnny Carmona, hair and makeup artist Yari Mejía, and drag performer Letal.

The season consisted of seven one-hour episodes.

Contestants 
Ages, names, and cities stated are at time of filming.

Notes

Contestant progress
Legend:

Lip syncs

Judges

Main judges 
 Bernardo "Letal" Vázquez, drag queen and professional makeup artist
 Johnny Carmona, TV and Internet personality
 Yari Mejía, designer, stylist, singer and model

Guest judges 
Listed in chronological order.

 Susana Zabaleta, soprano and actress
 Los Jonas Vloggers, Internet personalities
 Alfonso Waithsman, makeup artist
 Regina Orozco, actress and singer
 Alex Córdova, photographer
 Cesar "Teo" Doroteo, comedian and Internet personality
 Manelyk González, Internet personality
 Mannuna, actor and comedian
 Quique Galdeano, entrepreneur and Internet personality
 Vanessa Claudio, Puerto Rican model and TV personality

Special guests
Guests who will appear in episodes, but not judge on the main stage.

Episode 2
 Pedro Gea, dancer and choreographer

Episode 4
 Chio, alebrijes craftsman

Episode 5
 Quecho Muñoz, actor, singer, and writer

Episode 7
 Paris Bang Bang, drag performer
 Rhoma Queen, drag performer

Episodes
<onlyinclude>

References 

2018 Mexican television series debuts
Mexican reality television series
Mexican LGBT-related television shows
Drag (clothing) television shows
Reality competition television series
2010s LGBT-related reality television series
2018 in LGBT history